Patrick Huot (born April 9, 1975) is a Canadian politician in the province of Quebec, who was elected to represent the riding of Vanier in the National Assembly of Quebec in the 2008 provincial election. He is a member of the Quebec Liberal Party.

Huot has a bachelor's degree in political sciences and a master's degree in political analysis. He was elected as a city councillor for Duberger district in Quebec City Council, and was also a member of the Youth and Municipality Commission of the Union des municipalités du Québec.

External links
 
 Liberal Party biography 

1975 births
Living people
French Quebecers
Quebec City councillors
Quebec Liberal Party MNAs
21st-century Canadian politicians
Laval Rouge et Or athletes